Peter Anthony Taglianetti (born August 15, 1963) is an American former NHL  defenseman and former college hockey coach at Washington & Jefferson College. With the Pittsburgh Penguins, he won the Stanley Cup in 1991 and 1992. Taglianetti is also a former Pittsburgh Penguins broadcaster.

Career statistics

Regular season and playoffs

Awards and honors

Personal
Taglianetti married Alison Casey and had four sons and a daughter with her. The couple divorced in 1999. Twin sons, Andrew and Jon, played for Pittsburgh Panthers football; Andrew from 2008 until 2012 and Jon for three games in 2009. Both boys also worked as stick boys for the Pittsburgh Penguins. 

Taglianetti was one of several professional athletes who participated in the Yokozuna Bodyslam Challenge on board the USS Intrepid on July 4, 1993. Taglianetti attempted to lift the 568 lb. Yokozuna, but could not get the wrestler to leave his feet.

References

External links

1963 births
Living people
American men's ice hockey defensemen
Cleveland Lumberjacks players
Ice hockey coaches from Massachusetts
Minnesota North Stars players
Moncton Hawks players
National Hockey League broadcasters
People from Framingham, Massachusetts
Pittsburgh Penguins announcers
Pittsburgh Penguins players
Providence Bruins players
Providence Friars men's ice hockey players
Sherbrooke Canadiens players
Stanley Cup champions
Tampa Bay Lightning players
Washington & Jefferson Presidents coaches
Winnipeg Jets (1979–1996) draft picks
Winnipeg Jets (1979–1996) players
AHCA Division I men's ice hockey All-Americans
Ice hockey players from Massachusetts